National Assembly elections were held in Bhutan for the first time on 24 March 2008. Two parties were registered by the Election Commission of Bhutan to contest the elections; Druk Phuensum Tshogpa, led by Jigme Y. Thinley, which was formed by the  merger of the Bhutan People's United Party and All People's Party, and the People's Democratic Party (PDP). A third political party, the Bhutan National Party (BNP), had its application for the registration refused.

Electoral system
The elections for the 47 seats of the National Assembly were planned to be held in two rounds: In the first round, voters would have voted for a party. The two parties with the largest share of the national vote would then have been able to field candidates in the 47 constituencies. However, as only two parties had successfully registered for the election, the election was held in one round.

Background
On 21 April 2007, a mock election was held to prepare the population of Bhutan for the imminent change to democracy. These elections were held in all 47 National Assembly constituencies and at 869 polling stations with around 1,000 voters at each one of them. The parties "contesting" the election were the Druk Blue Party, the Druk Green Party, the Druk Red Party and the Druk Yellow Party (with Druk being Dzongkha for "thunder dragon"), each of them representing certain values as their "party manifesto": yellow for traditional values, red for industrial development, blue for fairness and accountability, and green for the environment. The two parties winning the most votes were to proceed to a run-off election scheduled for 28 May. Election observers were present from the United Nations and from India.

The results of the first round saw the Druk Yellow Party receive a plurality of the vote.

The two leading parties, Druk Yellow Party and Druk Red Party, put up randomly chosen high school students as candidates in the 47 constituencies in the second round on 28 May 2007. The Druk Yellow Party swept the vote and won 46 of the 47 constituencies. Turnout in the second round was 66%.

283,506 people had registered to vote, though it is considered likely that a total of 400,000 would have been eligible to register as voters.

Schedule
The election procedure began with the submission of the letters of intent, lists of candidates, copies of election manifestos and audited financial statements by the two political parties contesting the elections to the election commission followed by the release of the party manifestos by them on 22 January 2008.

From 31 January to 7 February 2008 both political parties submitted the nomination papers for their candidates for the 47 constituencies. The candidates, whose nominations were accepted, started campaigning in their constituencies from 7 February. The election campaign ended at 9:00 on 22 March. The last date for receiving the postal ballots was 18 February. The elections were held on 24 March from 09:00 to 17:00 followed by the counting of ballots on the same day. The results were declared on 25 March.

All eligible voters were allowed to register with the election commission until 20 February 2008 for the inclusion of their names in the voters list which was updated to include those eligible voters who were eighteen years old on or before 1 January 2008. The final electoral roll was published on 5 March 2008.

Campaign
There were few differences between the platforms of the two parties and both pledged to follow the king's guidelines of "pursuing Gross National Happiness". Both party leaders had also previously served in governments.

Results

Voter turnout reached nearly 80% by the time the polls closed, and the Bhutan Peace and Prosperity Party reportedly won 44 seats, with the People's Democratic Party winning only three seats (Phuentsholing in Chhukha, Goenkhatoe-Laya in Gasa and Sombeykha in Haa). The PDP's leader, Sangay Ngedup, who was also the ruling king's uncle, lost his own constituency by 380 votes. However, due to a mistake in tallying the votes in Phuntsholing, the BPPP had actually won 45 seats and the PDP only 2.

The BPPP's large-scale victory may have been due to it being perceived as the more royalist of the two parties.

Aftermath
The two PDP members who were elected refused to take up their seats and resigned their mandates, claiming that the civil servants informally campaigned for the DPT and influenced the result.

The DPT officially approved its leader as candidate for Prime Minister on 5 April 2008. He took office on 9 April.

Although analysts were worried that the small representation of the opposition might obstruct the functioning of the newly founded democratic system, the next elections in 2013 were won by the PDP.

References

National Assembly elections in Bhutan
Bhutan
General election
Bhutan